Agape – Agape / Love – Love is the fourteenth album by Popol Vuh. It was originally released in 1983 on Uniton. In 2004 SPV re-released the album with one bonus track.

Track listing 
All tracks composed by Florian Fricke except where noted.

 "Hand in Hand" – 2:52
 "They Danced, They Laughed, As of Old" (Daniel Fichelscher) – 4:49
 "Love, Life, Death" – 1:28
 "The Christ Is Near" – 3:50
 "Love – Love" – 5:20
 "Behold, the Drover Summonds" – 5:52
 "Agape – Agape" – 4:55
 "Why Do I Still Sleep" – 7:58

2004 bonus track
 "Circledance" (Fricke, Fichelscher) – 2:36

Personnel 
 Florian Fricke – piano, vocals, percussion
 Daniel Fichelscher – guitar, percussion, vocals
 Conny Veit – guitar
 Renate Knaup – vocals

Guest musicians
 Frank Fielder
 Jan Lorck-Schierning
 Nina

Credits 
Recorded at Bavaria Studio, Munich, June–October 1982 
Recorded and mixed by Stefan Massimo Jauch, Peter Kramper, Angie Melitoupulos 
Produced by Florian Fricke and Popol Vuh

Cover design by Bengt Olson

Liner notes 

Behold, the drover summons:
Why do I still sleep?
Behold, the drover summons:
Agape, Agape
Hand in hand.
Behold, the drover summons:
Ha Ram Sam Sam
Ha Ram Sam Sam
Gully Gully, Gully Gully
Gully Ram Ram Sam
Agape, Agape
Love, love
Why do I still sleep?

References

External links 

http://www.venco.com.pl/~acrux/agape.htm
https://web.archive.org/web/20081029050641/http://www.furious.com/perfect/populvuh.html (Comprehensive article & review of every album, in English)
https://web.archive.org/web/20080119183122/http://www.enricobassi.it/popvuhdiscografia80.htm (featuring the original credits)

Popol Vuh (band) albums
1983 albums